Henry Martyn Long (October 28, 1836 in Pittsburgh – December 24, 1909) was a politician and businessman in Allegheny County, Pennsylvania. He served several terms in the Pennsylvania House of Representatives, including time as speaker.

References

Members of the Pennsylvania House of Representatives
1836 births
1909 deaths
People from Allegheny County, Pennsylvania
19th-century American politicians
19th-century American businesspeople